Garduño is a surname. Notable people with the surname include:

Eduardo Garduño (born 1928), Mexican footballer
Miguel Garduño (born 1991), Mexican footballer
Patricia Garduño (born 1960), Mexican politician
Felipe Garduño (born 1966), Mexican Engineer

Other uses
Garduño's, a chain of casual dining restaurants serving Mexican and New Mexican cuisine